Year 173 (CLXXIII) was a common year starting on Thursday (link will display the full calendar) of the Julian calendar. At the time, it was known as the Year of the Consulship of Severus and Pompeianus (or, less frequently, year 926 Ab urbe condita). The denomination 173 for this year has been used since the early medieval period, when the Anno Domini calendar era became the prevalent method in Europe for naming years.

Events 
 By place 
 Roman Empire 
 Gnaeus Claudius Severus and Tiberius Claudius Pompeianus become Roman Consuls.
 Given control of the Eastern Empire, Avidius Cassius, the governor of Syria, crushes an insurrection of shepherds known as the Boukoloi.

Births 
 Maximinus Thrax ("the Thracian"), Roman emperor (d. 238)
 Mi Heng, Chinese writer and musician (d. 198)

Deaths 
 Donatus of Muenstereifel, Roman soldier and martyr (b. AD 140)

References